This is a list of the United States Billboard Dance Club Songs number-one hits of 2015.

References

United States Dance
2015
2015 in American music